θ Mensae, Latinized to Theta Mensae, is a star located in the southern circumpolar constellation Mensa. It has an apparent magnitude of 5.45, making it faintly visible to the naked eye if viewed under ideal conditions. Based on parallax measurements from Gaia Data Release 3, the object is estimated to be 385 light years distant.

This is a solitary, B-type main-sequence star with a stellar classification of B9.5 V. Houk and Cowley (1975) give it a class of B9.5/A0 III/IV, indicating that it is a B9.5-A0 star with the blended luminosity class of a giant star and a subgiant. It radiates 124 solar luminosities from its photosphere and it has an effective temperature of 9,938 K, giving it a bluish-white hue. It is estimated to be 266 million years old, having completed 85.2% of its main sequence lifetime, hence the large radius.

Data from the  Transiting Exoplanet Survey Satellite suggests that Theta Mensae may be a slowly pulsating B-type star plus a variable star with rotation modulations

References

54239
2689
Mensae, Theta
PD-79 00238
Mensa (constellation)
033384
B-type main-sequence stars
Mensae, 42